Beauvois is a commune in the Pas-de-Calais department in the Hauts-de-France region in northern France.

Geography
A small village located 30 miles (50 km) west-northwest of Arras at the junction of the D104 with the D99 road.

Population
The inhabitants are called Beauvoisains.

Sights
 The church of St. Jean-Baptiste, dating from the nineteenth century.
 The statue of Dikembe Mutombo built in 1843.

See also
 Communes of the Pas-de-Calais department

References

Communes of Pas-de-Calais